Virgins is a 1984 novel written by Caryl Rivers. Rivers wrote a 1986 sequel called Girls Forever Brave and True.

Overview
A coming of age story of Catholic high school girls in the 1950s.

References

External links
Google Books

1984 American novels
1984 debut novels
Pocket Books books